Parvoscincus is a genus of skinks, lizards in the family Scincidae. The genus is endemic to the Philippines.

Description

Species
The genus Parvoscincus contains 24 species which are recognized as being valid, many of them described in the 21st century.

Nota bene: A binomial authority in parentheses indicates that the species was originally described in a genus other than Parvoscincus.

References

Further reading
Ferner, John W.; Brown, Rafe M.; Greer, Allen E. (1997). "A New Genus and Species of Moist Closed Canopy Forest Skinks from the Philippines". Journal of Herpetology 31 (2): 187–192. (Parvoscincus, new genus, P. sisoni, new species).

 
Lizard genera
 
 
Taxa named by John W. Ferner
Taxa named by Rafe M. Brown
Taxa named by Allen Eddy Greer